Revolve is the second studio album by English singer John Newman. It was released on 16 October 2015 by Universal and Island Records. The album includes the singles "Come and Get It" and "Tiring Game".

Singles
"Come and Get It" was released as the album's first single on 17 July 2015. It peaked at number 5 on the UK Singles Chart.

"Tiring Game" was released as the second single on 26 August 2015 and has peaked at number 134 on the UK Singles Chart. The song features vocals from American singer Charlie Wilson.

Other songs
Calvin Harris' song "Blame" features Newman and appears on the deluxe edition of the album. It was released as a single from Harris' album Motion on 5 September 2014. The song reached number one on the UK Singles Chart.

Critical reception
Andy Kellman of AllMusic wrote in his 3 and a half star review "Released almost exactly two years after the UK chart topping and platinum selling Tribute, Revolve more closely follows Calvin Harris' equally successful "Blame" on which John Newman provided a typically full-throttle vocal and somewhat contradictory lines like "Guilt is burning" and "Don't blame it on me". Although Newman made this album with a new set of collaborators, including fellow producer/songwriters Greg Kurstin and Jack Splash, its foundation is likewise in muscular retro soul that blares and bolts and manages to keep up with the singer's superhuman level of energy. There are lighter diversions into house and disco including "Tiring Game," featuring Charlie Wilson, and Newman dials it down every now and then for ballads, but Revolve is very much in line with the winning formula of Tribute. Its wider emotional range and stylistic switch ups, none of which is outside Newman's grasp give it a slight edge."

Track listing

Notes
Credits adapted from album liner notes.

Charts

Release history

References

2015 albums
John Newman (singer) albums
Albums produced by Greg Kurstin
Albums produced by Calvin Harris